= Rocky Peak (Humboldt County, Nevada) =

Mountain in the state of Nevada

Coordinates: 40°59′58″N 118°58′49″W

Rocky Peak is a summit in the U.S. state of Nevada. The elevation is 4,924 feet (1,501 m).

Rocky Peak was so named on account of its rocky character.
